Cerdanyola Club d'Hoquei, also known as Maheco Cerdanyola for sponsorship reasons, is a Catalan rink hockey club from Cerdanyola del Vallès (Vallès Occidental).

History
Established in 1936, it makes Cerdanyola the oldest rink hockey club in Spain. The men's team, which nowadays plays in the second tier, major successes were reaching the finals of the 1973 Copa del Rey and the 1985 CERS Cup, lost to Reus Deportiu and Hockey Novara respectively. The women's team won both the OK Liga and the Copa de la Reina in 2010.

Titles
Women:
Spanish League (1)
2010
Spanish Cup (1)
2010

Season to season

Men's team

Women's team

References

External links
Official website

Sports clubs established in 1936
Catalan rink hockey clubs
Sports clubs in Barcelona
Cerdanyola del Vallès